Terence "Terry" Bowes (born 17 August 1951) is a former Rhodesian sportsman who represented his country in both cricket and rugby union during the 1970s.

Bowes, a flyhalf, was first capped for Rhodesia in 1970. A former Hamilton High School student, he played at club level for Old Miltonians. Off the field he worked for a Bulawayo steel company.

As a right-arm fast-medium bowler, Bowes was a good enough cricketer to appear in four first-class cricket matches for Rhodesia. Three of those were in the 1971/72 Currie Cup season and the other in 1974/75. His best performances came on debut, against Eastern Province, when he took 3-38 in the first innings, including the wickets of both openers.

References

1951 births
Cricketers from Bulawayo
White Rhodesian people
Rhodesian people of British descent
Rhodesia cricketers
Rhodesian rugby union players
Living people